Mikhail Petrovich Biryukov (born 15 March 1987) is a Russian former professional football player.

Club career
He made his Russian Football National League debut for FC Ural Yekaterinburg on 22 August 2012 in a game against FC Salyut Belgorod.

External links
 
 

1987 births
People from Rostov Oblast
Living people
Russian footballers
FC SKA Rostov-on-Don players
FC Ural Yekaterinburg players
FC Fakel Voronezh players
FC Taganrog players
FC Dynamo Saint Petersburg players
FC Rotor Volgograd players
Association football forwards
FC Tambov players
FC Tyumen players
Sportspeople from Rostov Oblast